Giuseppe Beghetto (born 8 October 1939) is a retired Italian cyclist who was active between 1958 and 1971 on the road and track. On the track, he won three gold and three silver medals in the sprint at the world championships of 1961–1968. He also won a gold medal in the tandem event at the 1960 Summer Olympics, together with his sprint rival Sergio Bianchetto, and set world records in the 200 m (11.40) and in 1 km (1:08.40). On the road, he won two stages of Giro di Sardegna in 1969 and took part in the 1970 Tour de France.

Personal life
His sons, Massimo and Luigi are former professional footballers. His grandson Andrea is a current footballer for Genoa.

References

1939 births
Living people
Italian male cyclists
Olympic gold medalists for Italy
Cyclists at the 1960 Summer Olympics
Olympic cyclists of Italy
Cyclists from the Province of Padua
Olympic medalists in cycling
Medalists at the 1960 Summer Olympics
UCI Track Cycling World Champions (men)
Italian track cyclists
20th-century Italian people